Gabriel Reis Lopes Rocha (born March 12, 1984 in Rio de Janeiro) is a water polo player from Brazil. He competed in two consecutive Pan American Games for his native country, starting in 2003. Reis won two silver medals at this event with the Brazil men's national water polo team.

References
 Profile

1984 births
Living people
Brazilian male water polo players
Water polo players from Rio de Janeiro (city)
Pan American Games silver medalists for Brazil
Pan American Games bronze medalists for Brazil
Pan American Games medalists in water polo
Water polo players at the 2003 Pan American Games
Water polo players at the 2007 Pan American Games
Water polo players at the 2011 Pan American Games
Medalists at the 2003 Pan American Games
Medalists at the 2007 Pan American Games
Medalists at the 2011 Pan American Games
South American champions
21st-century Brazilian people